Muhammad Hamzah (born on January 1, 1986) is an Indonesian footballer that currently plays for Persiwa Wamena in the Indonesia Super League.

References

External links
Muhammad Hamzah at Liga Indonesia

1986 births
Living people
Association football defenders
Indonesian footballers
Indonesian Premier Division players
Liga 1 (Indonesia) players
Persibo Bojonegoro players
Persebaya Surabaya players
Persiwa Wamena players
People from Tidore
Sportspeople from North Maluku